Silicon is a chemical element with symbol Si and atomic number 14.

Silicon may also refer to:

 Silicon (journal), a scientific journal
 Silicon (band), a band on one of Domino Recording Company's small labels, Weird World
 Apple silicon, a series of processors designed by Apple

See also

 Isotopes of silicon
 List of places with "Silicon" names
 Si (disambiguation)